Museum of the Revolution may refer to:
Museum of the Revolution (Algeria)
Museum of the Revolution (Cuba)
Museum of the Revolution (El Salvador)
Museum of the American Revolution in Philadelphia, Pennsylvania, United States